Jacques Bernard Hombron and Honoré Jacquinot describe the Auckland Islands merganser
Death of Jean Victoire Audouin
Joseph Fortuné Théodore Eydoux
Edward Blyth takes the position of curator at the museum of the Asiatic Society of Bengal 
Elizabeth Gould completes the bird illustrations for Zoology of the Voyage of H.M.S. Beagle 
Isidore Geoffroy Saint-Hilaire becomes a professor (birds and mammals) at  Muséum national d'histoire naturelle 
Salomon Müller and Hermann Schlegel describe the lesser fish eagle in Verhandelingen over de Natuurlijke Geschiedenis der Nederlandsch Overzeesche Bezittingen door de leden natuurkundige commissie in Indie andere Schrijvers. Uitgegeven op last van den Koning.
Thomas Richard Heywood Thomson expedition to Niger.  Thomson, an ornithologist,  was accompanied  by Louis Fraser .
Heinrich Gätke, German ornithologist and artist, moves to Heligoland as secretary to the British Governor and begins a long study of the birds there.
Karl Friedrich Wilhelm Berge publishes Die Fortpflanzung europäischer und aussereuropäischer Vögel. Ein Beitrag zur Naturgeschichte derselben (Stuttgart, L.F. Rieger, 1840–1841).

Ongoing events
The Birds of Australia birds first described in this work in 1841 include the rock parrot, the topknot pigeon, the red-backed kingfisher, the red-browed treecreeper, the white-quilled rock pigeon, the little curlew and the black stilt
William Jardine and Prideaux John Selby with the co-operation of James Ebenezer Bicheno Illustrations of ornithology various publishers (Four volumes) 1825 and [1836–43]. Although issued partly in connection with the volume of plates, under the same title (at the time of issue), text and plates were purchasable separately and the publishers ... express the hope, also voiced by the author in his preface to the present work, that the text will constitute an independent work of reference. Vol. I was issued originally in 1825 [by A. Constable, Edinburgh], with nomenclature according to Temminck

Birding and ornithology by year
1841 in science